Aleksandr Vladimirovich Kulikov (born 19 March 1988) is a Russian professional football player. He plays for FC KAMAZ Naberezhnye Chelny.

Club career
He won the 2010 CIS Cup with FC Rubin Kazan.

He made his Russian Premier League debut for PFC Spartak Nalchik on 3 April 2011 in a game against FC Zenit Saint Petersburg.

External links
 

1988 births
Footballers from Vologda
Living people
Russian footballers
Russia youth international footballers
Association football defenders
FC Rubin Kazan players
FC Salyut Belgorod players
FC Krasnodar players
PFC Spartak Nalchik players
FC Neftekhimik Nizhnekamsk players
FC Luch Vladivostok players
FC Avangard Kursk players
FC Tyumen players
FC Nizhny Novgorod (2015) players
FC KAMAZ Naberezhnye Chelny players
Russian Premier League players
Russian First League players
Russian Second League players